is a Japanese long-distance runner who specializes in the 5000 metres, 10,000 metres and the marathon race. He owned the former men's marathon Asian record.

International competitions

Personal bests
3000 metres - 7:41.87 min (1999/Japanese record)
5000 metres - 13:13.40 min (1998/Japanese record)
10,000 metres - 27:35.09 min (2001/Former Japanese record)
Half marathon - 1:01:07 hrs (2003)
Marathon - 2:06:16 hrs (2002/Former Asian record)

References

1970 births
Living people
Japanese male long-distance runners
Japanese male marathon runners
Olympic male long-distance runners
Olympic athletes of Japan
Athletes (track and field) at the 1996 Summer Olympics
Athletes (track and field) at the 2000 Summer Olympics
Asian Games gold medalists for Japan
Asian Games gold medalists in athletics (track and field)
Medalists at the 1994 Asian Games
Athletes (track and field) at the 1994 Asian Games
Universiade bronze medalists for Japan
Universiade medalists in athletics (track and field)
Medalists at the 1993 Summer Universiade
World Athletics Championships athletes for Japan
Japan Championships in Athletics winners